VTV, previously named sportOne is a private television network in Indonesia owned by Visi Media Asia (VIVA), a unit of Bakrie Group.

References

External links 

Television networks in Indonesia
Television channels and stations established in 2013
Bakrie Group